Kotagala is a small town in the Nuwara Eliya District of the Central Province, Sri Lanka. It is located 35.8 km (22.2 mi) from Nuwara Eliya at an elevation of 1,247 m (4,091 ft) above sea level.

Attractions 

 Devon Falls, a 97 m (318 ft) high waterfall
 St. Clair's Falls, an 80 m (260 ft) high and 50 m (160 ft) wide waterfall
 60 feet railway bridge
 Sri Muthu Vinayagar Kovil, a Hindu temple

Education 

 Kotagala Tamil Maha Vidyalayam
 Cambridge College
 Kotagala Teachers' Training College

Post and telephone 

 Sri Lanka 00 94
 Area code 051
 Postal code 22080

See also 
List of towns in Central Province, Sri Lanka

References

External links 

Populated places in Nuwara Eliya District